To Kati (Greek: Το Κάτι; English: The Something) is the eleventh studio album by Greek artist, Katy Garbi. It was released on 10 April 2000 by Sony Music Greece and received quadruple-platinum certification, selling over 200,000 units* (100,000^ albums). It was ranked among the best-selling Greek album of decade, and was the second top-seller album of 2000. The album was written entirely by Phoebus and was a farewell album under his contract with Sony Music Greece. It contains seven new songs, while the rest are greatest hits of their partnership.

In 2000, quadruple-platinum was the album whose sales exceeded 200,000 units.

Track listing

Singles 
The following singles were officially released to radio stations with music videos, except the song "Alitaki Mou". The song "Oli Mou I Stenahoria" was not released as single, but gained a lot of airplay.

"To Kati"Prior to the release date of the album, an exclusive preview of the first single "To Kati" began on MAD TV and then began broadcasting throughout Greek television. This single was the first to be composed by Phoebus to her since 1997. It marked a high point in her career as it held the number 1 position of the IFPI Singles Chart for a lot of weeks. The music video directed by Kostas Kapetanidis and released on 3 April 2000. The clip showcases first time Katy with red streaks over her black hair. The video itself is stylized using digital effects and over-contrasting colours that create surrealism. Scenes include Katy playing with and manipulating a group of shrunken men and a scene of her tearing up a photo of her real-life husband the moment he is mentioned in the song. The song was covered in 2017 by Greek artist, Eleni Foureira, retitled as "To Kati Pou Eheis".

"Alitaki Mou"

"Alitaki Mou" was the second single and released on 8 May 2000 and had good airplay.

"Epitelous""Epitelous" was the third single and gained massive success. It encountered a lot of media coverage as it was a duet with two of the most successful artists of the industry, Katy Garbi and Natasa Theodoridou, both of whom have both collaborated with Phoebus. The duet proved particularly popular amongst women as the lyrics form a dialogue between two women about their frustrations with men and relationships. Directed by Kostas Kapetanidis, it would make its debut on MAD TV during Katy's appearance on the show OK on 25 May 2000. The music video carried the style of the previous clip with the over-contrasting of colours, however it had much more serious feel. Contrasting from a dark blue background, Katy and Natasa are seated on opposing sofa chairs which slowly spin around on their axises. Other shots of the video include shelves filled with various items that symbolize womanhood each carrying a price tag, depicting how everything comes with a price that is paid. On MAD TV's Greek music video countdown on Greekweek, "Epitelous" placed 18th on the "All Times Best Top 30 Video Clips" and at Pop Corn Music Awards won the "Best Duet Of The Year" award."To Lathos Mou"

"To Lathos Mou" was the fourth and last single and released on 20 October 2000. It is a pop-rock ballad, which became an iconic song detailing Katy's vocal abilities. Directed by Giorgos Gkavalos, it was shot on 6 October at the triple-platinum certification party for the album where Katy performed live to an outdoor audience of thousands at the Village Park in Athens. Scenes include Katy walking through the Virgin Megastore before and after her performance, Katy being interviewed by the media, fans singing along, and finally her departure from the venue through a rush of fans. Filming the performance took over 5 takes along with the audience.

Credits
Credits adapted from liner notes.

Personnel 

 Giannis Bithikotsis – bouzouki, baglama (tracks: 2, 3, 4, 5) / cura (tracks: 2, 4)
 Giorgos Chatzopoulos – guitars (tracks: 1, 2, 3, 4, 5, 6, 7)
 Pavlos Diamantopoulos – bass (tracks: 2, 3, 4, 5, 6, 7)
 Akis Diximos – second vocal (tracks: 6)
 Kostas Doxas – amane vocals (tracks: 8)
 Katerina Kiriakou – backing vocals (tracks: 1, 2, 4, 5, 6, 7)
 Fedon Lionoudakis – accordion (tracks: 2, 3, 4)
 Andreas Mouzakis – drums (tracks: 2, 3, 4, 5, 6)
 Phoebus – orchestration (all tracks) / programming, keyboards (tracks: 1, 4, 6, 7, 8)
 Giorgos Roilos – percussion (tracks: 2, 3, 4, 5, 6)
 Alexandros Vourazelis – programming, keyboards (tracks: 2, 3, 5, 8)
 Martha Zioga – backing vocals (tracks: 1, 2, 4, 5, 6, 7)

Production 

 Vasilis Bouloubasis – hair styling
 Doukas Chatzidoukas – styling
 Thodoris Chrisanthopoulos (Fabelsound) – mastering
 Costas Coutayar – photographer
 Giannis Doulamis – production manager
 Vanesa Koutsopodiotou – make up
 Dimitris Rekouniotis – art direction
 Vaggelis Siapatis (Phase One studio) – sound engineer
 Katerina Sideridou – cover processing
 Giorgos Stabolis (Phase One studio) – sound engineer
 Manolis Vlachos (Phase One studio) – sound engineer, mix engineer
 Alexandros Vourazelis (Phase One studio) – sound engineer

Charts

Accolades
To Kati was gained two awards at the Pop Corn Music Awards 2000:
 "Best Dance Pop Song" (To Kati)
 "Best Duet Of The Year" (Epitelous with Natasa Theodoridou)

References

2000 compilation albums
Katy Garbi albums
Katy Garbi compilation albums
Albums produced by Phoebus (songwriter)
Greek-language albums
Sony Music Greece albums